Efteløt is a small village in Kongsberg municipality, Buskerud, Norway.

Efteløt is the location of Efteløt school (Efteløt skole) and Efteløt church (Efteløt kirke). Efteløt church was first constructed in Romanesque style from approx 1184. It is stone church with walls of natural stone up to 1 meter thick. It was rebuilt in 1876 into a more Gothic style. The church was restored  in 1953. The church is in the Kongsberg Joint Parish Council and the Tunsberg diocese.

References

External links
Efteløt Skole
Efteløt Bygdelag
 Efteløt kirke (PDF-brosjyre hos Tunsberg bispedømme)
 Sigrid og Håkon Christie: Efteløt kirke i «Norges kirker»

Villages in Buskerud